Colin Channer (born 13 October 1963) is a Jamaican writer, often referred to as "Bob Marley with a pen," due to the spiritual, sensual, social themes presented from a literary Jamaican perspective. Indeed, his first two full-length novels, Waiting in Vain and Satisfy My Soul, bear the titles of well known Marley songs. He has also written the short story collection Passing Through, and the novellas I'm Still Waiting and The Girl with the Golden Shoes. Some of his short stories have been anthologized.

Early life
Born in Kingston, Jamaica, Colin Channer is the youngest of four children. He attended the Ardenne and Meadowbrook High Schools, where his writing career began with the penning of love poems and other such correspondence on behalf of male students at $1 a letter—poems costing an extra 50 cents. After high school, Channer migrated to New York on 24 July 1982, intent on a career in journalism. But it was his discovery of Caryl Phillips' The Final Passage that allowed him to see the possibilities of fiction writing from an authentic Caribbean—specifically Jamaican—perspective. Channer went on to earn a B.A. in Media Communications from CUNY Hunter College.

In 1988, Channer moved to Atlanta, where he lived for three years, working as a magazine journalist. He returned to New York in 1991 after undergoing a cornea transplant to save his failing eyesight. He began writing his first novel on speculation, then attempted to get it sold. In this time, he worked as a freelance copyeditor in various design firms and advertising agencies. He also wrote a collection of short stories and a screenplay without guarantee that any of them would be released. Two of the short stories were anthologized in Soulfires. In 1998, the novel was published as Waiting in Vain, which was selected as a Critic's Choice by The Washington Post and hailed as a clear redefinition of the Caribbean novel. The novel, whose main characters were Jamaican, dealt with contemporary issues of class and identity in a multicultural context. Waiting in Vain was also excerpted in Hot Spots: The best erotic writing in Modern Fiction, which placed Channer in the company of writers such as Russell Banks, E. L. Doctorow, Don DeLillo, and David Foster Wallace. Time Out New York also selected this award-winning book as Book of the Summer.

The screenplay became the novella I'm Still Waiting, which was one of four anthologized stories in the volume Got To Be Real. The book itself was singular in that it was a collection by the leading black male writers of the day, the others being E. Lynn Harris, Eric Jerome Dickey, and Marcus Major.

Another of the short stories from that period was developed into his second novel, Satisfy My Soul. Released in 2002, Satisfy My Soul depicted the conflict between African spirituality and Christianity in the context of Black relationships.

Passing Through, published in 2004, is a collection of connected stories set on the fictional Caribbean island of San Carlos. The stories span the entire twentieth century and move in chronological order from 1903 to the present day.

Literary style
Channer has cited Naguib Mahfouz, Gabriel Garcia Marquez, V.S. Naipaul, John Updike, and even Bob Marley among his influences. Similar to Marley, Channer has established his literary style with an unapologetic sensuality, contemporary themes with profound thematic undercurrents, diverse backdrops such as Ghana, London, New York City, and Jamaica, as well as dialogue steeped in Jamaican patois. This has also caused many critics to deem him a reggae writer.

Additional ventures
Although he is best known as a novelist, Colin Channer's influence has reached beyond the world of literature to touch the public with his words in other ways. In 2001, he was named as co-creative director of Eziba, an online retailer of global handicrafts which went out of business in 2005. After his successes with Eziba, he launched his own design and branding firm, Squad 1962. Based in Chelsea, Squad 1962 was retained by Island Outpost, the collection of boutique hotels created by Island Records founder Chris Blackwell, the Rock and Roll Hall of Fame inductee who launched the global careers of musicians such as Bob Marley, U2 and Melissa Etheridge.

In 2001, along with poet Kwame Dawes, Channer also launched the Calabash International Literary Festival Trust, a registered not-for-profit entity whose mission is "to transform the literary arts in the Caribbean by being the region’s best-managed producer of workshops, seminars and performances." The annual festival takes place each year at Jake's in Treasure Beach, Jamaica.

Calabash has become the festival of choice for some of the world's most gifted authors. 2005 launched The Calabash Chapbook Series, which, to date, includes six books of poems from workshop members. Of these, Ishion Hutchinson, was accepted into NYU's creative writing master's program. In July 2006, Akashic Books published the fiction anthology Iron Balloons: Hit Fiction from Jamaica's Calabash Writer's Workshop from the original workshop. Channer edited the volume, as well as contributing the short story "How to Beat a Child the Right and Proper Way".

In addition to being the founder and artistic director of Calabash, Channer is the founder and bass player of the reggae band pecock Jaxxon. Channer has taught in London, New York City, and Jamaica. He was an assistant professor of English and coordinator of the B.A. creative writing program at CUNY Medgar Evers College and is currently a Newhouse Visiting Professor in Creative Writing at Wellesley College. A dual citizen of Jamaica and the United States, Channer lives with his family in the Fort Greene neighborhood of Brooklyn, New York.

List of publications
Soulfires: Young Black Men on Love and Violence, with the short stories "Black Boy, Brown Girl, Brownstone" and "The Ballad of the Sad Chanteuse" (Penguin, 1996)
Waiting in Vain (One World/Ballantine, 1998)
Got To Be Real, with the novella "I'm Still Waiting", (New American Library, 2000)
Satisfy My Soul (One World/Ballantine, 2002)
Passing Through (One World/Ballantine, 2004)
Iron Balloons (Akashic Books, 2006)
The Girl with the Golden Shoes (Akashic Books, 2007)

References

 https://web.archive.org/web/20071012070806/http://www.jamaicansrus.com/a2z.asp?test=articles&name=colinchanner122004&sidemenu=yes
 https://web.archive.org/web/20061209141655/http://www.writingclasses.com/FacultyBios/facultyProfileByInstructor.php/TeacherID/104822

External links
  Colin Channer website
 Interview with Colin Channer, 1. February 2003
http://www.eziba.com
https://web.archive.org/web/20070928185113/http://www.squad1962.com/

21st-century Jamaican novelists
African-American novelists
20th-century American novelists
21st-century American novelists
Jamaican emigrants to the United States
Hunter College alumni
Living people
1963 births
American male novelists
American male short story writers
20th-century American short story writers
21st-century American short story writers
Jamaican male novelists
20th-century American male writers
21st-century American male writers
People from Fort Greene, Brooklyn
20th-century African-American writers
21st-century African-American writers
African-American male writers